Viscount Harcourt, of Stanton Harcourt in the County of Oxford, was a title created twice for members of the Harcourt family, once in the Peerage of Great Britain and once in the Peerage of the United Kingdom.

It was first created in the Peerage of Great Britain for Lord Chancellor Simon Harcourt, who was created Baron Harcourt in 1711, Viscount Harcourt in 1721, and Earl Harcourt and Viscount Nuneham in 1749. For more information on these titles, which all became extinct in 1830, see Earl Harcourt.

The viscountcy was revived in 1917 in favour of Lewis Vernon Harcourt,
 also created Baron Nuneham, of Nuneham Courtenay in the County of Oxford, in the Peerage of the United Kingdom. Harcourt was the son of Sir William Vernon Harcourt, son of William Vernon Harcourt, son of the Honourable and Right Reverend Edward Venables-Vernon-Harcourt, son of George Venables-Vernon, 1st Baron Vernon, by his third wife, Martha Harcourt, daughter of Simon Harcourt, son of Simon Harcourt, 1st Viscount Harcourt.

After the death of the first viscount in 1922, the second viscount succeeded his father while still a student at Eton College. He married twice but left no sons; the title became extinct upon his own death in 1979.

Viscount Harcourt, first creation (1721)
See Earl Harcourt

Viscount Harcourt, second creation (1917)
Lewis Vernon Harcourt, 1st Viscount Harcourt (1863–1922)
William Edward Harcourt, 2nd Viscount Harcourt (1908–1979)

See also
Earl Harcourt
Baron Vernon

References

Work cited

Extinct viscountcies in the Peerage of the United Kingdom
Viscount
Noble titles created in 1721
Noble titles created in 1917
Noble titles created for UK MPs
Peerages created for the Lord High Chancellor of Great Britain
1917 establishments in the United Kingdom
1979 disestablishments in the United Kingdom